Dumeril's monitor (Varanus dumerilii) is a species of lizard in the family Varanidae. The species is endemic to Southeast Asia.

Etymology and naming
The specific name, dumerilii, is in honour of the French zoologist André Marie Constant Duméril.

In Thailand, V. dumerilii is known by the common name, túdtū̀ (ตุ๊ดตู่), which is an animal that appeared in children's folk songs.

Geographic range
Dumeril's monitor is found in southern Burma and north of the Isthmus of Kra to Kanchanaburi Province in Thailand, as well as in Peninsular Malaysia, throughout Borneo, Sumatra, Riau, Bangka–Belitung and other smaller islands of Indonesia.

Habitat

Diet
V. dumerilii is a crab specialist; however, it has been observed eating snails, other molluscs, insects, fish, frogs, turtle eggs, birds, and smaller rodents. Little is known overall about this species compared to other monitor lizards.

Description
Adult Dumeril's monitors are largely dark brown, with occasional brighter indistinct crossbars. For juveniles the colors and patterns are quite different. "The major color is a dark varnish black which is interrupted by several yellow crossways bars on the back." The head of juveniles is shiny orange-red or sometimes yellow. This juvenile coloration disappears after only 4–8 weeks.

Behavior
V. dumerilii is arboreal and diurnal.

Reproduction
V. dumerilii is oviparous. Clutch size is 4–23 eggs.

Subspecies
There are two described subspecies:
Varanus dumerilii dumerilii 
Varanus dumerilii heteropholis 

Note: Sprackland made V. d. heteropholis a synonym of V. d. dumerilii.

References

Further reading
Amer, Sayed A. M.; Kumazawa, Yoshinori (2008). "Timing of a mtDNA gene rearrangement and intercontinental dispersal of varanid lizards". Genes Genet. Syst. 83: 275–280.
Auffenberg W (1988). Gray's monitor lizard. Gainesville: University of Florida.
Ávalos, J. de; Martínez Carrión, P. (1997). "Warane ". Reptilia (Münster) 2 (5): 16-21. (in German).
Barbour T (1921). "Aquatic skinks and arboreal monitors". Copeia 1921 (1): 42-44.
Boulenger GA (1885). Catalogue of lizards in the British Museum (Natural History). Second Edition. Volume II ... Varanidæ ... London: Trustees of the British Museum (Natural History). (Taylor and Francis, printers). xiii + 497 pp. + Plates I-XXIV. (Varanus dumerilii, pp. 312–313).
Brandenberg T (1983). Monitors in the Indo-Australian Archipelago. Leiden: E.J. Brill. 121 pp.
Coborn, John (1987). Snakes and lizards: Their care and breeding in captivity. Newton Abbott: David and Charles Publishing.
Cota M, Chan-ard T, Mekchai S, Laoteaw S (2008). "Geographical Distribution, Instinctive Feeding Behavior and Report of Nocturnal Activity of Varanus dumerilii in Thailand". Biawak 2 (4): 152-158.
Cox MJ, van Dijk PP, Nabhitabhata J, Thirakhupt K (1998). A Photographic Guide to Snakes and other Reptiles of Peninsular Malaysia, Singapore and Thailand. Ralph Curtis Publishing. 144 pp.
Davis R, Darling R, Darlington A (1986). "Ritualised combat in captive V. dumerilii ". Herpetological Review 17 (4): 85-86.
Davis RB, Phillips LG (1991). "A method of sexing Dumeril's monitor Varanus dumerili ". Herp. Review 22 (1): 18-19.
Harrison JL, Boo-Liat L (1957). "Monitors of Malaya". Malay Nature Journal 12 (1): 1-10.
Horn H-G, Schulz B (1977). "Varanus dumerilii, wie ihn nicht jeder kennt ". Das Aquarium 11 (9): 37-38. (in German).
Lekagul B (1969). "Monitors of Thailand". Conservation News of S.E. Asia 8: 31-32.
Losos JB, Greene HW (1988). "Ecological and evolutionary implications of diet in monitor lizards". Biological Journal of the Linnean Society 35: 379-407.
Mertens R (1942). "Die Familie der Waranae (Varanidae) ". Abhandlungen der Senckenberischen Naturforschenden Gesellschaft 462; 465; 466. (in German).
Nutphand W (no date). The Monitors of Thailand. Bangkok: Mitphadung Publishing Office.
Pitman CRS (1962). "More snake and lizard predators of birds". Bulletin of the British Ornithologists' Club 82 (3): 45-55.
Radford L, Payne FL (1989). "The reproduction and management of Varanus dumerilii ". International Zoo Yearbook 28: 153-155.
Raven HC (1946). "Predators eating green turtle eggs in the East Indies". Copeia 1946 (1): 48.
de Rooij N (1915). The Reptiles of the Indo-Australian Archipelago. Leiden: E.J. Brill.
Schlegel H (1839). Abbildungen neuer oder unvollständig bekannter AMPHIBIEN, nach der Natur oder dem Leben entworfen herausgegeben und mit einem erläuternden Texte begleitet. Düsseldorf: Arnz & Comp. xiv + 141 pp. (Monitor dumerilii, new species, p. 78). (in German).
Smith MA (1922). "On a Collection of Reptiles and Batrachians from the mountains of Pahang, Malay Peninsula". Journal of the Federated Malay States 10: 263-282. (Varanus dumerilii, p. 269).
Smith HC (1930). "The monitor lizards of Burma". Journal of the Bombay Natural History Society 34: 367-373.
Taylor EH (1963). "Lizards of Thailand". University of Kansas Science Bulletin 44 (14): 687-1077. (Varanus dumerilii, pp. 915, 918-920).
Sprackland RG (1976). "Notes on Dumeril's monitor lizard Varanus dumerili (Schlegel)". Sarawak Museum Journal 24 (45): 287-291.

External links
Photo of  Dumeril's Monitor at Whozoo.org

Varanus
Reptiles of Indonesia
Reptiles of Thailand
Reptiles of Myanmar
Reptiles of Malaysia
Reptiles of Borneo
Reptiles described in 1839
Taxa named by Hermann Schlegel